Dhirendra Debnath Shambhu (born 14 December 1948) is a Bangladesh Awami League politician and the incumbent Jatiya Sangsad member representing the Barguna-1 constituency.

Early life 
Shambhu was born 14 December 1948. He has a law degree and a M.A. degree.

Career
Shambhu was elected to parliament from Barguna-1 as an Awami League candidate in 1991 with 44,722 votes while his nearest rival Mau. A Rashid Pir Shaheb of the Islami Oikya Jote had received 29,507 votes.

Shambhu was elected to parliament from Barguna-1 as an Awami League candidate in 1996 with 54,953 while his nearest rival Mau. A Rashid Pir Shaheb of the Islami Oikya Jote had received 28,479 votes.

Shambhu contested the 2001 election from Barguna-1 as an Awami League candidate but lost to independent candidate Md. Delwar Hossain. Shambhu had received 51,302 votes while Hossain had received 84,611 votes.

Shambhu was elected to parliament from Barguna-1 as an Awami League candidate in 2008 with 131,368 while his nearest rival Md. Delwar Hossain had received 80,590 votes.

Shambhu was elected to parliament from Barguna-1 as an Awami League candidate in 2014 with 85,080 while his nearest rival Md. Delwar Hossain had received 65,179 votes. In May 2018, he sued Emdadul Haque Milon, the editor of Kaler Kantho, after the newspaper published a report on corruption by Shambhu and his son, Sunam Debnath. He served as the deputy minister in an Awami League government. The Prothom Alo reported that he was involved with the theft from Test Relief and Food For Work. His son is accused of leading a organized crime racket in Barguna. Accused in the Murder of Rifat Sharif and asked why Sunam Debnath was not charged in the case as they were following his directives.

Shambhu was re-elected in 2018 as a candidate of Awami League from Barguna-1 with 319,957 votes while his nearest rival, Matiur Rahman Talukder of Bangladesh Nationalist Party had 15,344 votes.

References

Living people
1948 births
Awami League politicians
5th Jatiya Sangsad members
7th Jatiya Sangsad members
9th Jatiya Sangsad members
10th Jatiya Sangsad members
11th Jatiya Sangsad members
Deputy Ministers of Shipping (Bangladesh)
Place of birth missing (living people)